The Madonna of the Rose Garden is a tempera on panel painting (124x64 cm) made by Sandro Botticelli, whose date of between 1469 and 1470 makes it one of his earliest paintings. It is now in the Uffizi Gallery in Florence.

History 

The work was in the Chamber of Commerce of Florence which leads to the hypothesis that like Botticelli's earlier painting, the Madonna della loggia, it had been commissioned either by the Wool Guild or the  Tribunale della Mercanzia.

Wilhelm von Bode was the first to date the work to the artist's juvenile phase, in particular to the period of Verrocchio, 1469–1470, which has since been   confirmed by other scholars.

Description and style 

The Virgin Mary, with a pensive attitude, is holding the Christ Child on her knees beneath a loggia with columns supporting a semicircular arch with a coffered ceiling, framing the head of the Virgin and following the curved profile of the board. Behind Mary extends a garden with its pink roses dominating the foreground. Below her is a floor with framed marble tiles which demonstrates the painter's mastery of perspective technique.

The roses symbolize one of the titles of Mary, "Mystical Rose". The pomegranate, which Mary holds in her hand and which the Child is tasting, symbolizes fertility, royalty, and with its red color, the blood of the Passion of Jesus.

The work shows incisive use of chiaroscuro reminiscent of Verrocchio, in whose workshop Botticelli may have trained. The same type of child, with a large oval head and joyful lively expression, can be seen in Verrocchio's sculpture Putto con delfino from the same period. The figure of Mary is elongated and loosely posed, much more so than in the works of Filippo Lippi, another of the young Botticelli's models.

There are some uncertainties in space such as the disproportion of the architectural background which is too small compared to the figure of Mary and also compared to the flowers in the garden behind her.

References 

Silvia Malaguzzi, Botticelli.  Firenze, 2009.  English ed. p. 15 Google books  
L'opera completa del Botticelli, collana Classici dell'arte Rizzoli, Rizzoli, Milan, 1978.
Bruno Santi, Botticelli, in I protagonisti dell'arte italiana, Scala Group, Florence 2001  
Pierluigi De Vecchi, Elda Cerchiari, I tempi dell'arte, volume 2, Éditions Bompiani, Milan, 1999  
Gloria Fossi, Uffizi, Giunti, Florence, 2004

External links
Official catalogue entry 

Paintings by Sandro Botticelli
Paintings of the Madonna and Child by Sandro Botticelli
1469 paintings